The 2003–04 Copa Federación de España was the 11th staging of the Copa Federación de España, a knockout competition for Spanish football clubs in Segunda División B and Tercera División.

The competition began in August 2004 with the Regional stages and ended with the finals on 1 and 14 April 2004.

Regional tournaments

Asturias tournament

Preliminary round

Group A

Group B

Group C

Group D

Final bracket

Castile and León tournament

Final

|}

National tournament

Round of 32

|}

Round of 16

|}

Quarter-finals

|}

Semifinals

|}

Final

|}

References
2000–2009 Copa Federación results
Asturias tournament results

Copa Federación de España seasons